In enzymology, a 7,8-dihydroxykynurenate 8,8a-dioxygenase is an enzyme that catalyzes the chemical reaction

7,8-dihydroxykynurenate + O2  5-(3-carboxy-3-oxopropenyl)-4,6-dihydroxypyridine-2-carboxylate

Thus, the two substrates of this enzyme are 7,8-dihydroxykynurenate and O2, whereas its product is 5-(3-carboxy-3-oxopropenyl)-4,6-dihydroxypyridine-2-carboxylate.

This enzyme belongs to the family of oxidoreductases, specifically those acting on single donors with O2 as oxidant and incorporation of two atoms of oxygen into the substrate (oxygenases). The oxygen incorporated need not be derived from O2.  The systematic name of this enzyme class is 7,8-dihydroxykynurenate:oxygen 8,8a-oxidoreductase (decyclizing). Other names in common use include 7,8-dihydroxykynurenate oxygenase, and 7,8-dihydroxykynurenate 8,8alpha-dioxygenase.  This enzyme participates in tryptophan metabolism.  It employs one cofactor, iron.

References

 

EC 1.13.11
Iron enzymes
Enzymes of unknown structure